Dienville is a commune in the Aube department in north-central France.

History
The village of Dienville is mentioned in 864 under the name Dienvilla. There remains an Ancient Roman road, a vestige of that era.

On 1 February 1814 the village was fought over during the Battle of La Rothiere.

Population
Dienville was the home of Abbé Courtalon Delestre (1735-1786), a historian and poet, and :fr:Jean-Baptiste Courtalon (1740-1797), Cleric of the Chapel for Louis XV and Chaplain of Louis XVI.

See also
Communes of the Aube department
Parc naturel régional de la Forêt d'Orient

References

Communes of Aube